I Stand Alone may refer to:

 I Stand Alone (Agnetha Fältskog album), a 1987 album by Agnetha Fältskog
 “I Stand Alone”, by Steve Perry from the movie Quest for Camelot and the album Greatest Hits + Five Unreleased
 I Stand Alone (Al Kooper album), a 1968 album by Al Kooper
 I Stand Alone (Ramblin' Jack Elliott album), a 2006 album by Ramblin' Jack Elliott
 "I Stand Alone" (Godsmack song), the title of a song by Godsmack
 "I Stand Alone" (Takako Matsu song), the title of a song by Takako Matsu
 "I Stand Alone", a song by Jackyl from the album  Jackyl
 I Stand Alone (film), the English title of Seul contre tous, a French film directed by Gaspar Noé

See also
"Alone I Stand", a song by Killswitch Engage from Incarnate, 2016